Phenol sulfotransferase may refer to:
 SULT1A1, a human gene encoding a sulfotransferase
 SULT1A2, a human gene encoding a sulfotransferase
 SULT1A3, a human gene encoding a sulfotransferase